Marko Tomas (born 3 January 1985) is a retired Croatian professional basketball player. He represented the Croatian national basketball team internationally.

Professional career
In 2007, Tomas won the Spanish League and ULEB Cup championships with Real Madrid. He was then sent to Fuenlabrada on loan to gain experience in the 2007–08 season. On September 18, 2009, he was waived by Real.

On September 20, 2009, he signed a one-year deal with Cibona.

On June 23, 2010, he signed a two-year deal with Fenerbahçe Ülker.

On August 7, 2012, Tomas signed a one-year contract with the Croatian team Cedevita. On July 24, 2013, he re-signed with Cedevita for two more seasons.

On July 30, 2015, he signed with Turkish club TED Ankara Kolejliler for the 2015–16 BSL season.

On October 29, 2016, Tomas returned to Cedevita for the rest of the 2016–17 season.

On October 3, 2017, he signed an open contract with his former club Cibona.

In October 2018 he joined another Croatian club: this time the less ambitious Zabok that was coached by his brother Ivan. After playing just two games for Zabok he moved to Gaziantep of the Turkish Super League.

On August 8, 2020, he has signed with Gaziantep Basketbol of the Turkish Basketbol Süper Ligi (BSL).

Career statistics

Euroleague

|-
| style="text-align:left;"| 2005–06
| style="text-align:left;" rowspan=2| Real Madrid
| 15 || 6 || 23.4 || .413 || .410 || .833 || 2.1 || 1.8 || .9 || .0 || 6.5 || 5.2
|-
| style="text-align:left;"| 2008–09
| 17 || 3 || 13.3 || .439 || .313 || .846 || 1.7 || .6 || .6 || .1 || 5.3 || 5.2
|-
| style="text-align:left;"| 2009–10
| style="text-align:left;"| Cibona
| 16 || 16 || 34.2 || .389 || .330 || .809 || 3.1 || 1.9 || 1.1 || .3 || 16.4 || 14.3
|-
| style="text-align:left;"| 2010–11
| style="text-align:left;" rowspan=2| Fenerbahçe
| 15 || 14 || 22.7 || .402 || .418 || .676 || 3.1 || 1.3 || .7 || .0 || 8.5 || 6.7
|-
| style="text-align:left;"| 2011–12
| 6 || 3 || 16.4 || .280 || .286 || .750 || 1.7 || .3 || .8 || .0 || 3.5 || 1.0
|-
| style="text-align:left;"| 2012–13
| style="text-align:left;" rowspan=2| Cedevita
| 4 || 0 || 15.8 || .250 || .222 || .778 || 2.0 || .3 || .3 || .0 || 4.3 || 1.8
|-
| style="text-align:left;"| 2014–15
| 1 || 0 || 25.3 || .222 || .200 || .000 || 4.0 || .0 || 1.0 || .0 || 5.0 || 3.0
|- class="sortbottom"
| style="text-align:left;"| Career
| style="text-align:left;"|
| 74 || 42 || 22.3 || .389 || .350 || .790 || 2.4 || 1.2 || .8 || .1 || 8.5 || 7.0

Croatian national team
Tomas won the gold medal with the junior Croatian national basketball team at the European Junior Championship in 2002. He debuted for the senior Croatian national basketball team at the EuroBasket 2005. He later played at the EuroBasket 2007, EuroBasket 2011, EuroBasket 2015 and EuroBasket 2017. He also represented Croatia at the 2008 Olympic Games and the 2010 FIBA World Championship.

Personal life
Marko's older brother Ivan (born 1981) and younger brother Luka (born 1999) are both professionally tied to basketball. Ivan is a coach and former player while Luka is a player.

References

External links

Marko Tomas at aba-liga.com
Marko Tomas at draftexpress.com
Marko Tomas at eurobasket.com
Marko Tomas at euroleague.net
Marko Tomas at fiba.com
Marko Tomas at tblstat.net

1985 births
Living people
2010 FIBA World Championship players
ABA League players
Baloncesto Fuenlabrada players
Basketball players at the 2008 Summer Olympics
Croatian expatriate basketball people in Spain
Croatian expatriate basketball people in Turkey
Croatian men's basketball players
Fenerbahçe men's basketball players
Gaziantep Basketbol players
KK Cedevita players
KK Cibona players
KK Igokea players
KK Zabok players
KK Zagreb players
Liga ACB players
Olympic basketball players of Croatia
Real Madrid Baloncesto players
Shooting guards
Small forwards
Sportspeople from Koprivnica
TED Ankara Kolejliler players